Protosmia is a genus of subgenus Chelostomopsis in the family Megachilidae. There are more than 30 described species in Protosmia.

Species
These 31 species belong to the genus Protosmia:

 Protosmia asensioi Griswold & Parker, 1987
 Protosmia burmanica (Bingham, 1897)
 Protosmia capitata (Schletterer, 1889)
 Protosmia decipiens (Benoist, 1935)
 Protosmia devia Tkalcu, 1978
 Protosmia exenterata (Pérez, 1896)
 Protosmia glutinosa (Giraud, 1871)
 Protosmia hamulifera Griswold, 2013
 Protosmia humeralis (Pérez, 1896)
 Protosmia judaica (Mavromoustakis, 1948)
 Protosmia limbata (Benoist, 1935)
 Protosmia longiceps (Friese, 1899)
 Protosmia luctuosa (Lucas, 1848)
 Protosmia magnicapitis (Stanek, 1969)
 Protosmia megaceps (Kohl, 1906)
 Protosmia minutula (Pérez, 1896)
 Protosmia monstrosa (Pérez, 1895)
 Protosmia montana
 Protosmia octomaculata (Pérez, 1895)
 Protosmia paradoxa (Friese, 1899)
 Protosmia pulex (Benoist, 1935)
 Protosmia querquedula van der Zanden, 1994
 Protosmia rubifloris (Cockerell, 1898)
 Protosmia schwarzi Griswold, 2013
 Protosmia sicula (Dalla Torre & Friese, 1895)
 Protosmia sideritis Tkalcu, 1978
 Protosmia stelidoides (Pérez, 1895)
 Protosmia stigmatica (Pérez, 1895)
 Protosmia tauricola Popov, 1961
 Protosmia tiflensis (Morawitz, 1876)
 Protosmia trifida Griswold, 2013

References

Further reading

 
 
 

Megachilidae
Articles created by Qbugbot